Fifty Who Made DC Great is a one shot published by DC Comics to commemorate the company's 50th anniversary in 1985. It was published in comic book format but contained text articles with photographs and background caricatures.

Publication history
As explained by DC's then-President and Publisher Jenette Kahn, the profiles were of "fifty people and companies who have helped make DC Comics great. [W]e have chosen representatives from those who have pioneered new territory and who, by doing so, have shaped our past or our future". The articles were written by Barry Marx, Thomas Hill, and Joey Cavalieri and caricatures were provided by Steven Petruccio. Barry Marx was also the book's editor. Neal Pozner was the design director. The cover art, featuring Clark Kent holding the "DC Bullet", was drawn by Curt Swan, Murphy Anderson, and Arne Starr.

The Fifty

Celebrity reminiscences
Brief statements made by several prominent individuals were included as "Celebrity Reminiscences". These included comments by Daniel P. Moynihan, Richard Corben, Ray Bradbury, Gloria Steinem, Mort Walker, Milton Glaser, Walter Koenig, Gene Siskel, Stephen King, Gene Simmons, Jim Henson, David L. Wolper, Stan Lee, Susan Stamberg, Roger Ebert, Brooke Shields, Carol Bellamy, and Whoopi Goldberg.

Legacy
Fifty Who Made DC Great has been used as a cited reference source for several books.  Among these are the following:
 The All-Star Companion Volume 1 by Roy Thomas.
 Comic Book Nation: The Transformation of Youth Culture in America by Bradford W. Wright.
 American National Biography: Supplement by Paul R. Betz and Mark Christopher Carnes.
 Of Comics and Men: A Cultural History of American Comic Books by Jean-Paul Gabilliet, Bart Beaty, and Nick Nguyen.
 75 Years of DC Comics The Art of Modern Mythmaking by Paul Levitz.

References

External links
 
 
 Fifty Who Made DC Great at Mike's Amazing World of DC Comics
 Fifty Who Made DC Great at Flickr

1985 comics debuts
1985 in comics
Biographical comics
DC Comics one-shots
DC Comics-related lists
DC Comics titles
Defunct American comics
Lists of comics by DC Comics
Golden jubilees